The definition of ultra-distance cycling is far more vague than in ultra running (any race longer than a marathon) or in ultra-triathlon (any race longer than an Ironman Triathlon).

Bike events that cover these distances but which are split into stages do not fit most definitions of ultra-distance races – the clock needs to run continuously from start to finish. Even so, extra-long stages within a longer race may be long enough to be an ultra-distance race by themselves. In addition, any team events in which individual cyclists do not complete the full distance are not considered to be ultra-distance.

Bike races that can be described as ultra-distance are organized below according to the type or format of the race. This is not an exhaustive list of such races, but the longest, most important (as measured by the level of media interest), or most popular (as measured by the number of participants) races within each category are mentioned.

Track cycling
In the early days of bicycle racing in the late 1800s, six-day racing on velodromes was popular. Only the original race format is a true ultra-distance cycling race as defined here because it was a simple test of how far an individual cyclist could ride during the six day-long event. The format evolved away from this to involve teams of two riding in a relay format. Later, the non-stop nature of the race was changed to only race during part of each day.

Road racing

Professional 
In the early days of professional road bicycle racing there were many one-day road races and stages in grand tours that were much longer than those of today.

Paris–Brest–Paris was a professional bike race that covered a massive  in France, and was only held every 10 years from 1891 until 1951, but has since continued as a randonneuring event (see below).

Cycling's grand tours used to include far longer stages than they do today.

Supported ultracycling races
There are no longer any true ultra-distance bike races (i.e., that are longer than ) that are affiliated with cycling's main governing body, the UCI; most modern ultra-distance races are instead affiliated with the World Ultra-Cycling Association (WUCA).

In this format of racing, the cyclists race individually (drafting and group riding are not allowed) but each cyclist has at least one support vehicle and a team of support staff. This specific format of racing is often referred to as "ultracycling", which is why it would be incorrect to refer to all ultra-distance cycling as ultracycling. Many ultracycling races include a team category that operates in a relay format and so does not meet the criteria for an ultra-distance cycling race used here (in which individuals must ride the complete distance).

The oldest ultracycling race in Europe is the Glocknerman, an Austrian cycling event with a distance of  that was first held in 1997.

Road time trials
12-hour and 24-hour road cycling time trials have been around for a long time and are still common. In these events, cyclists attempt to ride the maximum distance possible within the time limit.
This involves riding the maximum distance possible within a 12-month period. Since Kurt Searvogel's record year, Ms. Amanda Coker significantly surpassed Kurt's annual mileage record with a new record of over 86,000 miles in 365 days. Amanda continued on to break the record for fastest time to 100,000 miles, at approximately 420 days.

Some ultra-distance time trials are held at permanent motorsport racetracks, such as Bike Sebring (Sebring International Raceway), Rad am Ring (Nürburgring), Monza 12h Cycling Marathon (Autodromo Nazionale Monza), Cycling Zandvoort 24h (Circuit Zandvoort), 24h BiCircuit Festival (Circuit de Barcelona-Catalunya), and Revolve24 Endurance Cycling Challenge (Brands Hatch and The Bend Motorsport Park). These lack any road traffic and have smooth road surfaces.

Unsupported ultracycling & bikepacking road races
Some races have recently become popular that recall the early era of professional bike racing in which riders were unsupported and raced day and night. As in other ultra-cycling events there is a mass start, but in bikepacking races drafting is not allowed and all support is forbidden. There are no support vehicles and riders must find all of their supplies, accommodation, etc. from commercial sources along the route or bring it with them. Most events will, however, allow "trail magic" from strangers through kind actions, gifts, and other forms of encouragement so long as the "magic" does not move the bike.

Unsupported rides are sometimes done as completely solo attempts outside of organized rides but are still well-publicized. These often involve riding point to point (including city to city), for example Vegas In 24.

Randonneuring
Randonneuring events (also called brevets or audaxes) are generally non-competitive rides where racing is not the focus; they are ridden more as personal challenges. They also differ from most ultracycling and bikepacking races in that group riding and drafting is allowed, with limits. Supplies and accommodation are often provided by the organizers at intermediate checkpoints, but the use of support vehicles is not allowed outside of the checkpoints.
 
The randonnee version evolved from the professional bike race (see above) and is held every four years. For a more complete list, see the page on randonneuring.

Cyclosportives/Gran fondos
Cyclosportives (also known as gran fondos) are mass-participation cycling events. They are far less serious than pure bike races, but times are recorded and prizes are often awarded to the fastest people. The organizers normally provide full support in terms of marking the route and providing feed stations.

However, there are several similar events that are longer.

In New Zealand, there is the Lake Taupo Cycle Challenge.

Century rides

Other road cycling records
There are a few classic long-distance cycling routes for which time records are kept even though riders normally do not race simultaneously. This record is currently held by Scottish endurance cyclist Mark Beaumont. The longest record of this format is the around the world cycling record, which requires the cyclist to cover  by bike plus other requirements. A new women's around the world cycling record is currently being attempted by Scottish endurance cyclist Jenny Graham. In 2012 and 2014, a mass-start event called the World Cycle Race was organized based on these rules.

Gravel biking

In the early days of road bike racing, most roads were not paved, so most races were held primarily on unpaved/dirt/gravel roads. Due to road infrastructure improving with time, road bike racing is now done almost entirely on paved roads. However, in the 21st century, riding and racing road bikes on gravel roads has gained popularity, at least in part due to improvements in technology.

Bicycle technology is seen as the largest contributor to the popularity of gravel biking because technology has allowed designers to integrate key characteristics of bikes across disciplines into one bike. For instance, the relaxed geometry of mountain bikes is the foundation of gravel bike frames but gravel bikes are lighter, faster and more responsive than a mountain bike. Gravel bikes also use characteristics of both cyclocross and road bikes for better comfort on long rides and the wheel clearance to accommodate rides done in torrential conditions.

The culture of gravel biking has also been another reason it has grown in popularity. Gravel races rarely call for a team of coaches and bicycle technicians because the courses susceptible to varying weather that is hard to train and prepare for. Gravel riders are generally focused on getting through a course rather than maintaining a pace during races. This give way to camaraderie on the trail and caters to a fun and relaxed atmosphere that is not always present in road and mountain bike races.

In 2018, a  race called the DKXL was added, and 25, 50, and 100 mile courses were added in 2013.

Unbound Gravel is a great example of how much gravel biking has grown in recent years for example, in 2006 there was a total of 34 riders that participated in the 200 mile race. In June 2019, 2,750 riders lucky enough to be picked from a lottery crossed the start line of the Dirty Kanza 200 and the fact that organizers had to introduce other mileage categories also shows that gravel biking is about the adventure.

Mountain biking

As on the road, some of the most popular ultra-distance mountain bike events are 12 and 24-hour time trials, of which there are many all over the world. In addition, there are many mountain bike races of at least . Very few mountain bike races are longer than  because the average speed on typical mountain biking terrain is much slower than that on the road.

24 hour mountain bike races are where the bikepacking genre began, in which riders are entirely self-supported (see above for road-based bikepacking events). Also in Italy, the Italy Divide starts at the Roman Coliseum and finishes at Lake Garda, passing through Siena, Florence and Bologna en route. It mixes technical mountain bike sections with gravel trails.

In Central Asia, the Silk Road Mountain Race takes place in Kyrgyzstan, and covers 1,700 km (1,056 mi) in the Tien Shan mountain range.

In Australia, the Race to the Rock is an unsupported race through the Outback founded by Jesse Carlsson. The course and length differs each year, but generally finishes at Uluru; the 2018 edition was 3,500 km (2,175 mi) in total, and covered sections of Southern Australia as well as Tasmania.

Climbing-focused (Everesting)
Instead of trying to maximize the distance ridden in one ride, some people try to maximize the height gained in one ride. Everesting is a challenge that involves repeatedly cycling up and down the same hill multiple times until the total height gain matches the height of Mount Everest, . There are also records for the most height gain achieved within a certain time period, for instance 24 hours.

Everesting came to wider public attention during the height of the coronavirus pandemic when bored pro cyclists went in search of hills when the world tour was shut down.

References

External links
 UltraMarathon Cycling Association

 
Endurance games
Cycle racing